Cecil James "Jimmy" Gilbert (15 May 1923 – 7 July 2016) was a Scottish television producer, director and executive for the BBC.

Early life 
Gilbert was born in Edinburgh in May 1923 and educated at Edinburgh Academy, Edinburgh University and RADA. He served as a pilot with RAF Coastal Command during World War II, flying Handley Page Halifax and Boeing B-17 Flying Fortress aircraft from RAF Wick, Scotland.

Career 
As the co-devisor of The Frost Report, with David Frost, it was Gilbert who brought together Ronnie Barker and Ronnie Corbett, as well as most of the members of Monty Python. With the first director of The Two Ronnies, Terry Hughes, Gilbert created the format of the series which began in 1971. According to the Daily Telegraph obituary of Gilbert, the two men "were largely responsible for establishing the pattern of the show with its quick-fire verbal gags, double entendres and cavalcade of naive caricatures of British life: bumbling colonels, half-witted yokels and bosomy barmaids". The series ran until 1986. In addition to The Two Ronnies, Gilbert was an early producer of Last of the Summer Wine (1973), plus the first series of Whatever Happened to the Likely Lads? (also 1973). For the last series, Gilbert won a BAFTA in 1974 for Best Comedy, and was also nominated that year for Last of the Summer Wine in the category.

He succeeded Michael Mills as the BBC's Head of Comedy from 1973–1977. Gilbert was appointed as the BBC's Head of Light Entertainment in 1977, in succession to Bill Cotton, remaining in the post and with the BBC until 1982. Subsequently, he worked as a freelance.

In 2003, Gilbert appeared on the documentary special 30 Years of Last of the Summer Wine to discuss his role in helping to create the series.

Notes

1923 births
2016 deaths
Alumni of RADA
Alumni of the University of Edinburgh
People educated at Edinburgh Academy
BBC television producers
British television directors
British television producers
Royal Air Force pilots of World War II
British World War II bomber pilots